West End station may refer to:

West End station (DART), a DART train station in Dallas, Texas
West End station (MARTA), a MARTA train station in Atlanta, Georgia
Science Park station (MBTA), signed as Science Park/West End, an MBTA train station in Boston, Massachusetts